Iernut is a town in Mureș County, central Transylvania, Romania. It administers eight villages: Cipău (Maroscsapó), Deag (Marosdég), Lechința (Maroslekence), Oarba de Mureș (Marosorbó), Porumbac (Porumbáktanya), Racameț (Józseftanya), Sălcud (Szélkút), and Sfântu Gheorghe (Csapószentgyörgy). It officially became a town in 1989, as a result of the Romanian rural systematization program.

The commune is situated on the Transylvanian Plateau. It lies on the banks of the Mureș River; the Lechința River discharges into the Mureș here.

Demographics

The 2011 census revealed the following demographic data:
 Romanians (76.55%)
 Hungarians (13.36%)
 Roma (9.84%)
 others (0.18%)

Main sights
 The Reformed church (built between 1486 and 1593);
 Kornis-Rakóczi-Bethlen Castle (built in 1545);
 The two lakes near the city;
 Mureș River;
 Lupoaica;
 Old Buildings.

References

Populated places in Mureș County
Localities in Transylvania
Towns in Romania